Angela Elwell Hunt (born December 20, 1957) is a prolific Christian author, and her books include The Tale of Three Trees, The Debt, The Note, and The Nativity Story, among others.

Biography

Career
Angela Elwell Hunt was born in Winter Haven and grew up in Brevard County, Florida, graduating from Rockledge High School in 1975. She was also one of Brevard County's debutantes in that year.  In 1976-77 she traveled with Derric Johnson's "The Re'Generation," a ten-member vocal group. Hunt studied English and music at Liberty University and graduated magna cum laude in 1980.  She spent one year teaching high school. In 1983, she began her writing career.  In those early years as a freelance writer she wrote everything from business letters to catalog copy.  In the late 1980s, she received her first recognition as a writer, winning first place in a national competition with a manuscript and sketches that she and a friend submitted.  Her first book was published in 1988.

Hunt has published over one hundred fifty books since then, most of which have a Christian theme.  Hunt considers her some of her books to be parables."  Her books have touched on such diverse topics as cloning, immortality, prion diseases, breast cancer, mental illness, angels, family issues, spouse abuse, stuttering, adoption, divorce, dating, and man's relationship to animals.  Nearly five million copies of her books have been sold worldwide.

Her novel The Note was made into a Hallmark Channel movie with the same name which premiered in December 2007, and two other novels have been optioned for film (Uncharted and The Elevator).  Hunt was awarded an Angel Award from Excellence in Media eight times, as well as a 2000 Christy Award (for By Dawn's Early Light). She won the 2006 Romantic Times BookClub Lifetime Achievement Award, and three of her novels have been finalists for a Romance Writers of America RITA Award.  She has also been awarded the 2000 Holt Medallion for Inspirational Fiction for The Truth Teller. Her novel "The Face" was listed in Publishers Weekly "Best Books of the Year" (PW, 11/03/08).

Hunt often speaks and teaches at major writer's conferences, including the Mt. Hermon Christian Writer's Conference, the Florida Christian Writer's Conference, the Greater Philadelphia Christian Writer's Conference, the Colorado Christian Writer's Conference, and the Oregon Christian Writer's Conference. She participates as a founding instructor in the Glen Eyrie Writer's Summit, and has served as keynote speaker at the American Christian Fiction Writers conference, the Christian Writer's Guild Conference, the InScribe Christian Writers' Fellowship conference, the Liberty University Writers' Conference, and the Oregon Christian Writers Conference.

In 2013, Hunt established Angela Hunt Photography and began to develop a second part-time career, indulging her passion for learning and photography. She specializes in portraits and says she owes her interest in this career to her work as a volunteer photographer for shelter animals.  She is also a photographer for Now I Lay Me Down to Sleep, an organization that provides beautiful, compassionate portraits for families whose infants experience only a brief time on earth.

Personal life
In 2006, Hunt earned a Masters of Biblical Studies degree in Theology.  In 2008, she completed her doctorate in the same subject, and in 2015 she completed her Th.D. .

Hunt is married to a Baptist minister, Gary Hunt. They have two children, a daughter, Taryn, and a son, Tyler. She and her family live in Clearwater, Florida  with mastiffs—in 2001, one of her dogs was featured on Live With Regis and Kelly as the second largest dog in America. Hunt is passionate about her hobby of photographing shelter animals and has written short e-books for others who would like to contribute in the same way, Snapping Shelter Dogs and Snapping Shelter Cats.

Bibliography

Picture Books
The Chicken Who Loved Books, HuntHaven Press, Summer 2018
Nat the Brat, HuntHaven Press, December 2013
Bathtime for Brandon, HuntHaven Press, July 2013
Pretzels by the Dozen, HuntHaven Press, June 2013
Peter McPossum's Wiggles and Giggles, HuntHaven Press, June 2013
Too Many Tutus, HuntHaven Press, June 2013
The Sleeping Rose, Tommy Nelson, September 1998
Howie Hugemouth, Standard Publishing, June 1993.
Pretzels by the Dozen, Zondervan Publishing, 2002, 2013
The True Princess, D.C. Cook, 1992; Charisma Kids 2004
The Singing Shepherd, Lion Publishing, 1992, new edition 2020. 
Calico Bear, Tyndale House, 1991, 2013 
A Gift For Grandpa,  D.C. Cook, September 1991
The Tale of Three Trees, Lion Publishing, 1989
If I Had Long, Long Hair, Abingdon Press, 1988, 2013

Middle Grade Titles

The Young Believers series
with Stephen Arterburn, Tyndale House Publishers, May 2004 
Josiah, book one
Liane, book two
Noah, book three
Paige, book four
Shane, book five
Taz, book six

The Colonial Captives
juvenile historical fiction, Tyndale House
Books 1 and 2: Kimberly and the Captives, 1996
Books 3 and 4: The Deadly Chase, 1996

The Cassie Perkins Series, Tyndale House
A Forever Friend, 1991
A Basket of Roses, 1991
No More Broken Promises, 1991
A Dream to Cherish, 1992
The Much-Adored Sandy Shore, 1992
Love Burning Bright, 1992
Star Light, Star Bright, 1993
The Chance of a Lifetime, 1993
The Glory of Love, 1993

Other
Got God?, HuntHaven Press, 2013. 
Christian Friendship Bracelets Activity Pack, text, Tyndale House, 1996.
When Your Parents Pull Apart, Tyndale House, 1995
Where Dragons Dance, Wendy Pye Ltd., 1995,
Beauty from the Inside Out, Becoming the Best You Can Be, Co-authored With Laura Krauss Calenberg, Thomas Nelson, July 1993
If God Is Real, Where On Earth Is He?  Here's Life, 1991
Sit. Stay. Forever.  Hunt Haven Press, 2020. A gift book about the bond between dogs and their owners.

The Nicki Holland Series
Thomas Nelson. Reprint editions issued 2005
The Case of the Mystery Mark, 1991
The Case of the Teenage Terminator, 1991
The Case of the Phantom Friend, 1991
The Case of the Terrified Track Star, 1992
The Case of the Counterfeit Cash, 1992
The Case of the Haunting Of Lowell Lanes, 1992
The Case of the Birthday Bracelet, 1993
The Secret of Cravenhill Castle, 1993
The Riddle of Baby Rosalind, 1993

Dating
Now That You've Asked Her Out, Here's Life/Thomas Nelson, 1989
Now That He's Asked You Out, Here's Life/Thomas Nelson, 1989

General Nonfiction
Writing the Picture Book, HuntHaven Press, 2020. 
Dogs Having a Ball, HuntHaven Press, 2018. 
Writing Lessons from the Front; the First Ten Books, HuntHaven Press, 2015. 
The Fiction Writer's Book of Checklists, Writing Lessons from the Front series, HuntHaven Press, 2014. 
Writing Historical Fiction, Writing Lessons from the Front series, HuntHaven Press, 2014. 
Tension on the Line, Writing Lessons from the Front series, HuntHaven Press, 2014. 
The Plot Skeleton: Book 1, Writing Lessons from the Front series, HuntHaven Press, 2013. 
Creating Extraordinary Characters, book 2, Writing Lessons from the Front series, HuntHaven Press, 2013. 
Track Down the Weasel Words, Writing Lessons from the Front series, HuntHaven Press, 2013. 
Point of View, Writing Lessons from the Front series, HuntHaven Press, 2013. 
Evoking Emotions, Writing Lessons from the Front series, HuntHaven Press, 2013. 
Plans and Processes To Get Your Book Written, Writing Lessons from the Front series, HuntHaven Press, 2013. 
A Christian Writer's Possibly Useful Ruminations on a Life in Pages, Writing Lessons from the Front series, HuntHaven Press, 2013. 
Snapping Shelter Dogs. . . and Cats!,  Using Your Camera to Help Shelter Animals Find New Homes, Angela Hunt Communications, 2014. 
My Life as a Middle School Mom, Servant Books, 2000.
Loving Someone Else's Child, Tyndale House, 1992
The Adoption Option, Victor Books, 1989
Too Old To Ride, Too Young To Drive, Here's Life/Thomas Nelson, 1988
Just a Country Preacher, biography of B.R. Lakin, The Old Time Gospel Hour, 1986

Adult Fiction

Single Title Novels
Paul, Apostle of Christ, the novelization of the major motion picture, Bethany House Publishers, Spring 2018
Risen, the novelization of the major motion picture, Bethany House Publishers, December 2015
Passing Strangers, HuntHaven Press, May 2014
The Offering, Howard, 2013
Five Miles South of Peculiar, Howard, 2012
The Fine Art of Insincerity, Howard, 2011
Let Darkness Come, Mira, 2009
Taking a Chance on Love, Tyndale House, 2009, a novelization of the Hallmark movie written by Douglas Barr
She's In a Better Place, Tyndale House, 2008
The Face, Mira/Harlequin, 2008
She Always Wore Red, Tyndale House, 2008
Doesn’t She Look Natural?, Tyndale House, 2007
The Nativity Story, a novelization based on the screenplay by Mike Rich, Tyndale House, 2006
The Elevator, Steeple Hill/Harlequin, June 2007
Uncharted, Thomas Nelson, June 2006
Magdalene, Tyndale House, April 2005
A Time to Mend, Steeple Hill, April 2006 (formerly Gentle Touch)
The Novelist, Thomas Nelson, January 2006
Unspoken, Thomas Nelson, April 2005
The Awakening, Thomas Nelson, July 2004
The Debt, Thomas Nelson, January 2004
The Canopy, Thomas Nelson, July 2003
The Shadow Women, Warner, November 2002
The Pearl, Thomas Nelson, Spring 2003
The Justice, Thomas Nelson, January 2002
Then Comes Marriage, with Bill Myers, Zondervan Publishing, 2001.
The Note, Thomas Nelson, May 2001
The Story Jar, “The Yellow Sock,” a novella in an anthology written with Robin Lee Hatcher and Deborah Bedford, Multnomah, 2001.
The Immortal, Thomas Nelson, June 2000
The Truth Teller, Bethany House, May 1999. 	Reprinted by Thomas Nelson, 2006
Flee the Darkness, with Grant Jeffrey, Thomas Nelson, September 1998
By Dawn’s Early Light, with Grant Jeffrey, Thomas Nelson, July 1999
The Spear of Tyranny, with Grant Jeffrey, Thomas Nelson, 2000.
Gentle Touch, Bethany House, February 1997
The Proposal, Tyndale House, October 1996

Series

The Jerusalem Road series, Bethany House
Daughter of Cana, March 2020.
The Shepherd's Wife, October 2020.
A Woman of Words, Spring 2021.
The Apostle's Sister, Summer 2022.

The Silent Years series, Bethany House
Egypt's Sister, Summer 2017.
Judah's Wife, January 2018.
Jerusalem's Queen, Summer 2018.
King's Shadow, Summer 2019.

The Dangerous Beauty series, Bethany House
Esther, January 2015
Bathsheba, Fall 2015
Delilah, June 2016

The Heirs of Cahira O’Connor Series, Waterbrook
The Silver Sword, January 1998
The Golden Cross, October 1998
The Velvet Shadow, January 1999
The Emerald Isle, September 1999

The Keepers of the Ring Series
Historical Fiction, Tyndale House
Roanoke: The Lost Colony, 1996
Jamestown, 1996
Hartford, 1996
Rehoboth, 1997
Charles Towne, 1998

Legacies of the Ancient River series
Dreamers, January 1996, Bethany House. Re-released 2008 from Steeple Hill
Brothers, March, 1997, Bethany House. Re-released 2009 from Steeple Hill.
Journey, 1997, Bethany House. Re-released 2009 from Steeple Hill.

The Theyn Chronicles, Tyndale House
Afton of Margate Castle, 1993
The Troubadour's Quest, 1994
Ingram of the Irish, 1994

The Heavenly Daze series co-authored with Lori Copeland
The Island of Heavenly Daze, W Publishing, December 2000	
Grace in Autumn, W Publishing, 2001
Warmth in Winter, W Publishing, 2002
A Perfect Love, W Publishing, 2002
Hearts at Home, W Publishing, 2003

Harbingers, with Bill Myers, Frank E. Peretti, Alton Gansky, and Jeff Gerke
Sentinels, Harbingers #3, Amaris Media International, 2014
Infiltration, Harbingers #7, Amaris Media International, 2015
Hybrids, Harbingers #11, Amaris Media International, 2015
Fairy, Harbingers #15, Amaris Media International, 2016
Into the Blue, Harbingers #19, Amaris Media International, 2017

Collaborations--nonfiction
Redeeming Love: the Bible Study, Francine Rivers and Angela Hunt, Multnomah, Spring 2021.
Don't Blink, Brandon and Brittany Buell and Angela Hunt, Tyndale, September 2016.
Street God, Dimas Salaberrios and Angela Hunt, Tyndale, September 2015
Misconception, Paul and Shannon Morell and Angela Hunt, Howard, May 2010.
Why I Stayed, Gayle Haggard and Angela Hunt, Tyndale House, January 2010.
IdolEyes, Mandisa Hundley and Angela Hunt, Tyndale House, 2007
Don't Bet Against Me, Deanna Favre and Angela Hunt, Tyndale House, 2007
Heavenly Crowns, with Heather Whitestone McCallum, Zondervan, 2004.
Let God Surprise You, with Heather Whitestone McCallum, Zondervan, 2003.
Flashpoints, with Steve Arterburn, Tyndale House, 2002
Listening With My Heart, with Heather Whitestone, Miss America 1995, Doubleday, June 1997.
The Rise of Babylon, with Charles Dyer, Tyndale, 1991

Sources

External links
Angela Hunt Official Website
Angela Hunt's Blog
Angela Hunt Photography Website
Harbingers series Website

1957 births
Living people
American women writers
Christian writers
People from Winter Haven, Florida
People from Brevard County, Florida
Liberty University alumni
20th-century American novelists
21st-century American novelists
20th-century American women writers
21st-century American women writers